The year 2019 was the 16th year in the history of the Konfrontacja Sztuk Walki, a mixed martial arts promotion based in Poland. 2019 began with KSW 47.

List of events

Title fights

KSW Middleweight Championship Tournament bracket

KSW 47: The X-Warriors

'KSW 47: The X-Warriors' was a mixed martial arts event held by Konfrontacja Sztuk Walki on March 23, 2019 at the Atlas Arena in Łódź, Poland.

Background 
The event was headlined by a KSW Heavyweight Championship bout between the champion Phil De Fries and KSW Light Heavyweight Champion Tomasz Narkun.

A heavyweight superfight between the five-time World's Strongest Man Mariusz Pudzianowski and Olympic weightlifting gold medalist Szymon Kolecki took place as the co-main event.

Dricus Du Plessis was scheduled to fight against fellow former welterweight champion Borys Mankowski at KSW 47. However, Du Plessis was forced off the card due to a weight issue. Norman Parke has stepped in on short notice for Du Plessis to fight former welterweight champion.

Bonus awards

The following fighters were awarded bonuses:
 Fight of the Night: Borys Mańkowski vs. Norman Parke
 Knockout of the Night: Aleksandar Ilić
 Performance of the Night: Aleksandar Ilić

Results

KSW 48: Szymański vs. Parnasse 

'KSW 48: Parnasse vs. Szymański' will be a mixed martial arts event held by Konfrontacja Sztuk Walki on April 27, 2019 at the Globus Hall in Lublin, Poland.

Background 
Bonus awards

The following fighters were awarded bonuses:
 Fight of the Night: Michał Michalski vs. Savo Lazić
 Knockout of the Night: Filip Pejić

Results

KSW 49: Soldić vs. Kaszubowski

'KSW 49: Soldić vs. Kaszubowski' was a mixed martial arts event held by Konfrontacja Sztuk Walki on May 18, 2019 at the Ergo Arena in Gdańsk/Sopot, Poland.

Bonus awards

The following fighters were awarded bonuses:
 Fight of the Night: Scott Askham  vs. Michał Materla
 Knockout of the Night: Roberto Soldić
 Performance of the Night: Martin Zawada

Results

KSW 50: London

'KSW 50: London' was a mixed martial arts event held by Konfrontacja Sztuk Walki on September 14, 2019 at the Wembley Arena in London, England.

Background
Marian Ziolkowski has been forced to withdraw from his scheduled interim KSW Lightweight Championship bout against Norman Parke due to knee injury. Parke instead faced the former KSW Featherweight Championshion Marcin Wrzosek, who stepped in on two weeks’ notice for this encounter.

Phil De Fries was expected to defend his Heavyweight Championship against Damian Grabowski in the main event of the evening. However, Grabowski was forced off the card due to a hand injury. Luis Henrique has stepped in for the injured Grabowski to fight De Fries for the heavyweight title.

Patrik Kincl has been forced to withdraw from his scheduled KSW Welterweight Championship bout against Roberto Soldić due to a torn ligament in his arm. Soldić instead faced Michal Pietrzak, who stepped in on four days’ notice for this encounter. Instead of a welterweight title fight, the fight was 80 kg catchweight bout.

Bonus awards

The following fighters were awarded bonuses:
 Fight of the Night: Norman Parke vs. Marcin Wrzosek
 Knockout of the Night: Aleksandra Rola
 Submission of the Night: Tomasz Narkun

Results

KSW 51: Croatia

'KSW 51: Croatia' was a mixed martial arts event held by Konfrontacja Sztuk Walki on November 9, 2019 at the Arena Zagreb in Zagreb, Croatia.

Background
Krzysztof Klaczek had to withdraw from his match with Filip Pejić due to injuries sustained during training. Daniel Torres replaces Klaczek, he takes his place against Pejić.

Denis Stojnić has been forced to withdraw from his scheduled bout against Ante Delija due to an injury. Delija instead faced Oli Thompson, who stepped in on two days’ notice for this encounter.

Aleksandar Rakas was scheduled to face Krystian Kaszubowski on the main card, but Rakas had to withdraw from the fight when he suffered a foot injury due to a slip a day before the fight while walking his dog. Ivica Truscek stepped in on a day notice to face Kaszubowski.

Bonus awards

The following fighters were awarded bonuses:
 Fight of the Night: Sebastian Przybysz vs. Lemmy Krušič
 Knockout of the Night: Ivan Erslan
 Submission of the Night: Borys Mańkowski

Results

KSW 52: Race

'KSW 52: Race' was mixed martial arts event held by Konfrontacja Sztuk Walki on December 7, 2019 at the Gliwice Arena in Gliwice, Poland.

Background
Bonus awards

The following fighters were awarded bonuses:
 Fight of the Night: Michał Michalski vs. Albert Odzimkowski  
 Knockout of the Night: Maciej Kazieczko
 Submission of the Night: Karolina Owczarz
 Performance of the Night: Salahdine Parnasse

Results

See also
 2019 in UFC
 2019 in Bellator MMA
 2019 in ONE Championship
 2019 in M-1 Global
 2019 in Absolute Championship Akhmat
 2019 in RXF

References

External links
KSW 

2019 in mixed martial arts
Konfrontacja Sztuk Walki events
Konfrontacja Sztuk Walki events